Timberwolf rifle may refer to:

C14 Timberwolf, a sniper rifle
IMI Timber Wolf, a pump-action carbine